Saldinia is a genus of flowering plants belonging to the family Rubiaceae.

Its native range is Comoros and Madagascar.

Species
Species:

Saldinia acuminata 
Saldinia aegialodes 
Saldinia axillaris 
Saldinia boiviniana 
Saldinia bullata 
Saldinia coursiana 
Saldinia dasyclada 
Saldinia hirsuta 
Saldinia littoralis 
Saldinia longistipulata 
Saldinia mandracensis 
Saldinia myrtilloides 
Saldinia oblongifolia 
Saldinia obovatifolia 
Saldinia obtusata 
Saldinia pallida 
Saldinia phlebophylla 
Saldinia platyclada 
Saldinia proboscidea 
Saldinia pycnophylla 
Saldinia stenophylla 
Saldinia subacuminata

References

Rubiaceae
Rubiaceae genera